PAF College Sargodha is a Pakistan Air Force operated boarding school located in Sargodha, Punjab, Pakistan.  It was established in 1953. Founded as a feeding school for Pakistan Air Force Academy, it is now a public school since 1990 funded by the Pakistan Air Force.

History
In 1951, the Defence Committee, under the chairmanship of Liaqat Ali Khan, the prime minister of Pakistan, approved a project of establishing two feeder schools (the other being PAF Public School Lower Topa) for PAF Academy Risalpur. An agreement was signed with the Air Service Training Limited, Hamble, near Southampton, UK, to operate and manage the project for the first five years. The board of governors included Defense Secretary as the chairman and Commander-in-Chief Royal Pakistan Air Force (C-in-C RPAF) Air Vice Marshal L. W. Cannon as deputy chairman.

In 1952, the first entry of 100 boys was selected from East and West Pakistan. The present day School Sick Quarters (SSQ) served as the first Academic Block. Two boarding Houses were established in the Odeon Block with the names Tempest and Fury. In 1955, four residential blocks were constructed at the School. Two blocks carried the same old names, Tempest and Fury. The other two blocks were given the names Attacker and Sabre. Tempest House shed half its members to occupy Sabre House while Fury House did the same and half its members occupied Attacker House.

Eric Sprawson was the founding principal who served from Jan 1953 until  December 1957. Hugh Catchpole was the principal from February 1958 until June 1967 and Abdul Rehman Qureshi served in the role from June 1967 until January 1984.

In 1967, the school's name was changed from PAF Public School to PAF College Sargodha. The four houses Tempest, Fury, Attacker and Sabre were renamed as Younus, Iqbal, Munir and Rafiqui respectively after the names of pilots who laid down their lives during September 1965 War. The name of the school magazine was changed from "The Sargodhian" to "Shahbaz."

In August 1967, the Lower Topa School was also amalgamated with Sargodha. W and T Entries joined PAF College Sargodha and were absorbed into the existing four Houses. In 1968 U and V Entries from Lower Topa also joined Sargodha. At this two more Houses were established in the Odeon Block (Alam and Allauddin Houses). The college continued to function as a Public School until in 1973, when the requirement at the PAF Academy, Risalpur was raised to the degree level. Therefore, the college started functioning as a Degree College. This change closed the chapter of Public School system and the college started imparting full military training to the aviation cadets of both the GD (P) and Engineering Branches, which was followed by the flying training phase at PAF Academy, Risalpur. During this time two new houses (called squadrons at that time) were formed, Minhas and Saffi. However, in 1985, BSc classes were shifted to Risalpur and once again only FSc. classes were conducted at the college.

On reopening of the college as a public school, all the eight student houses were renamed and called Attacker, Falcon, Fury, Halifax, Mirage, Sabre, Starfighter, and Tempest.

In November 2001, the designation of Head of the Institution was renamed as the Principal. By 2002, the institution had also reverted to its old name PAF Public School Sargodha.

Infrastructure

The school maintains a two-story Academic Block and six lodging ‘Houses’. The other buildings comprise a mosque, an auditorium, a messing block, a canteen, a hobbies club and a hospital for students. Residential accommodation for the Principal, Vice Principal and the School faculty is located within the School boundaries.

House System
Each House organizes its own study periods, social functions, swimming, and indoor and outdoor games. The House is under the charge of a Housemaster who is assisted by an Assistant Housemaster and a Physical Training Instructor (PTI).

Apart from faculty and staff appointments, there are a number of student appointments. A student from the senior most entry is made Head boy of the School on his overall performance. Each House has a House Captain who is assisted two School Prefect and three House Prefects. House Captain is a student in charge of the various House activities.

Inter-house competitions are held in outdoor sports, (hockey, football, basketball), athletics, drill, swimming, qirat, debating, current affairs, and cleanliness. Shields and trophies are awarded to the winner of each competition. The Quaid-e-Azam Trophy is awarded to the overall Champion House.

Faculty and staff
The faculty comprises two academic departments, Science and Humanities:
 Humanities: English, Urdu, Pakistan Studies and Islamic Education.
 Sciences: Mathematics, Physics, Chemistry and Computer Sciences.

Physical training and drill of the students is supervised by the physical fitness and drill instructors. The other staff comprises the Adjutant, Bursar, Doctor, Psychologist, Khateeb for the Mosque and the requisite ministerial staff.

Academics
The students are prepared for the Secondary School Certificate and Intermediate Examination conducted by the Board of Intermediate and Secondary Education Sargodha. The following subjects are taught:
 Secondary School Certificate Examination: English, Urdu, Islamiat, Pakistan Studies, Mathematics, Physics, Chemistry and Computer Science.
 Intermediate Examination (Pre-Engineering Group): English, Urdu, Islamic Studies, Pakistan Studies, Mathematics, Physics and Chemistry.

Examinations
The School holds internal examinations to assess the ability of the students and prepare them for the Board Examinations. Progress tests, Send-Ups and Pre-Board Examinations are a feature of the School schedule.

The parents/guardians are regularly informed of their son's/ward's overall performance and attitude. The weak students take extra coaching classes in the evening. However, a student showing consistent poor performance is withdrawn from the School.

Routine and activities
Games and Physical Education
Afternoon games are compulsory for all the students. The School has six Football fields, five Hockey fields, five Basketball courts, one Squash court, one Cricket/Athletics field, one Gymnasium, and one Swimming Pool. For indoor games like Table Tennis, Carom board, Chess, and Draft, the facility is provided in each of the eight boarding Houses. Besides this, boys also receive training in Karate and Gymnastics They are also given an orientation in drill for their future careers in the armed forces.

Friendly Fixtures
The School plays friendly fixtures against similar institutions like PAF Public School Lower Topa, Military College Jhelum, Cadet College Hasan Abdal, Sadiq Public School Bahawalpur, Lawrence College Ghora Gali, Cadet College Petaro, Cadet College Larkana, Chand Bagh School Muridke, and Aitchison College Lahore.

Facilities and miscellaneous

Library and Audio-Visual Aids
The Academic Block maintains a central library. In addition, small libraries have been established in each House. Modern educational aids like OHPs and multimedia projector are used to make classroom instruction more effective.

Language Lab
For spoken English classes, the Academic block has a Language Laboratory.

Computer Labs
The School has two computer laboratories. These are equipped with P4 computers, multimedia and round the clock internet access. The boys are encouraged to keep e-mail addresses and are given instruction in Microsoft Office and IT.

Medical
The school has a hospital headed by an Air Force doctor, with staff. For specialized treatment, the boys are sent to the PAF Hospital Sargodha adjacent to the PAF Base, Mushaf where they are admitted in the Officer's Ward.

Vaccination and inoculation is carried out periodically. Students are medically examined, and an individual health record is maintained. The school also has an isolation ward for the segregation of patients with infectious diseases.

Dining Table
The School Mess is run by a committee presided by the Principal and is looked after by a Mess Secretary. Students are also associated with the management of the Mess. One representative from each House is a member of the Mess Committee that meets regularly to draw up the menu and discuss ways and means of improving the Mess. Meals include breakfast, long break, lunch and dinner.

Clubs
Some of the major clubs include Music club, Photography club, Science Club, Wood Work Club, Clay Modeling Club, and Arts and Music Club.

Recreational activities
Picnics are arranged regularly. The boys are taken to various recreational spots around Sargodha. A camping trip is annually made to Lower Topa, Murree by the senior-most entry.

School magazine
The magazine is published annually in two sections (English/Urdu) and contains articles and essays written by the students. Every student is given a cofy on payment.

Terms and holidays
The Academic year is divided into two terms, with the first one running from August to December and the second one running from January to June. At the end of each term, there are vacations.

Visits
The students receive visitors once a month on scheduled Sundays during the term.

Notable alumni
 Ahsan Iqbal, former Federal Education minister, Government of Pakistan
 Muhammad Abdul Mannan, Planning Minister of Bangladesh
 Shahid Aziz Siddiqi, Vice Chancellor, Ziauddin Medical University,  Karachi

Armed forces
 Air Chief Marshal Farooq Feroze Khan, former Chairman Joint Chiefs of Staff Committee (CJCSC) and Chief of Air Staff (CAS)
Air Chief Marshal Kaleem Saadat, former Chief of Air Staff (CAS), PAF
 Air Chief Marshal Tanvir Mahmood Ahmed, former Chief of Air Staff (CAS), PAF
 Air Chief Marshal Rao Qamar Suleman, former Chief of Air Staff (CAS), PAF
General Ahsan Saleem Hyat, former Vice Chief of Army Staff (VCOAS), Pakistan Army
 General Ehsan ul Haq, former Chairman Joint Chiefs of Staff Committee (CJCSC)
 General Moeen U Ahmed, former Chief of Army Staff, Bangladesh Army
 Air Marshal Shahid Lateef, former Vice Chief of Air Staff  (VCAS), PAF
 Lt Gen Ghulam Muhammad Malik, former Commander  X Corps, Rawalpindi
 Major General Muhamma Abul Manzur, Shaheed, Bir  Uttam, Bangladesh Army
 Gp. Capt Saiful Azam, Sitara-e-Jurat, PAF,  BAF
 Lieutenant Colonel |Mohammad Ziauddin  BU
 Flight Lieutenant Matiur Rahman (military pilot), Bir Sreshtho, Bangladesh Air Force.
 Air Vice Marshal Momtaz Uddin Ahmed, Chief of Air Staff, Bangladesh Air Force.
 Air Vice Marshal Sultan Mehmood, Chief of Air Staff, Bangladesh Air Force.
 Air Vice Marshal Mohammad Rafiqul Islam, Chief of Air Staff, Bangladesh Air Force.
 Air Vice Marshal Fakhrul Azam, Chief of Air Staff, Bangladesh Air Force.

See also
 PAF Public School Lower Topa
 Cadet College Hasan Abdal
 Military College Jhelum
 Cadet College Petaro
 Cadet College Fateh Jang

References

External links
 PAF Public School, Sargodha (Official) website
 PAF Public School Sargodha 2nd Official Site  
 Old Boys' Association website
 Sargodhians website

Boarding schools in Pakistan
Pakistan Air Force cadet colleges
Schools in Punjab, Pakistan
Military schools in Pakistan